The stories of the rogue sorcerer Simon Magus and his consort Helen, which showcased the early battles between religion and magic, have often captured the imagination of artists and writers.

Folklore
In Irish mythology, Mug Ruith is said to have been a student of Simon Magus, who taught him his magic skills and helped him build the flying machine roth rámach. Mug Ruith's daughter Tlachtga was raped by the three sons of Simon Magus and returned to Ireland where she gave birth to triplets on the hill that would bear her name.

Theatre and poetry
In Canto XIX of the Divine Comedy's Inferno by Dante Alighieri, Simon is in the third bolgia of the eighth circle of Hell.
 Simon and Helen appear in Christus: A Mystery and Helen of Tyre by Henry Wadsworth Longfellow.

Faust
Many aspects of the life of Simon Magus are echoed in the later Faust legend of Christopher Marlowe and Johann Wolfgang von Goethe. Hans Jonas writes, "surely few admirers of Marlowe's and Goethe's plays have an inkling that their hero is the descendant of a gnostic sectary, and that the beautiful Helen called up by his art was once the fallen Thought of God through whose raising mankind was to be saved."
 The presence of Helen of Troy.
The name "Faustus" ("the favored one"), both as a possible appellation of Simon in Rome, and with a person by that name appearing in the Clementine literature. Later, Augustine of Hippo became a fierce opponent of a certain Faustus the Manichean.
The homunculus.
Faust is employed by the Emperor, just as Simon is employed by Nero.
The ascent of Gretchen and Faust past the demons of Mephistopheles in Faust Part One and Faust Part Two, respectively, can be seen as mirroring the descent of the Ennoia and Simon past the world-creating angels. Additionally, the passage wherein Mephistopheles is distracted by the allures of seductive angels has its parallel in the Ennoia arousing desires in the world-creating angels who prevent her initial ascent.

Opera

 Simon is the principal villain in Arrigo Boito’s opera, Nerone (“Nero”).

Film
 Simon Magus is portrayed as a pivotal character, "Simon the Magician," played by Jack Palance, in the 1954 movie The Silver Chalice (which also debuted a young Paul Newman).
 In the 1997 movie The Saint during the opening scene, the protagonist Simon Templar refers to himself as Simon Magus, the magician.
 In the 1999 movie Simon Magus, the mystery of Simon Magus is set in contemporary Paris.

Television
 In the Year Two Space: 1999 episode "New Adam, New Eve", an extraterrestrial called "Magus" pretends to be God in front of the terrestrial inhabitants of Moonbase Alpha, but, when it is revealed that he is not the Lord, he tries to search pity in the Alphans by saying that he was, among the others who tried to imitate God, Simon Magus.

Books 

 Simon is the hero of a series of short stories and novels by Richard L. Tierney, set in the Cthulhu Mythos.
 According to the book The Templar Revelation, Simon Magus (not Jesus Christ) was the true heir of John the Baptist.
 Simon Magus was a villain in an early issue of DC Comics' original Justice League of America comic book series, and made a total of twelve appearances in DC Comics.
 A heroic sorcerer named Simon Magus appears in the comic book series Astro City by Kurt Busiek.
 In his 1961 novel Stranger in a Strange Land, science fiction writer Robert A. Heinlein refers to a character named "Professor" Simon Magus, a carnival grifter and mentalist who is described as a "likable scoundrel."
 In Illuminatus! a figure described as a transcended former human, who is also referred to as Satan, and calls himself "Malaclypse the Elder", claims that he had impersonated Jesus after the crucifixion, and after that had travelled under the name of Simon Magus.
 A character based on Simon Magus appears in Foucault's Pendulum by Umberto Eco.
 Simon Magus appears in the 2001 Scott McBain novel The Coins of Judas.
 Simon Magus is one of the central figures in Robin Cook's book "Intervention"
 In David Guterson's 2008 novel "The Other" John William Barry frequently signs his name as Simon Magus
 In Book of Magic, a sourcebook for the Mutants & Masterminds role-playing game, Simon Magus was one of the "Master Mages" (skilled mages tasked with protecting the Earth dimension from mystical threats), and forged The Pact, a binding spell that altered/strengthened the dimensional barriers so much that the gods and other entities from outside Earth's dimension could no longer enter without being called upon by mortal power and permission.
 The character of Simon Leclerc in Charles Williams's All Hallow's Eve is based on Simon Magus.
 The Illusionist, a novel by Anita Mason, is a fictionalised account of the life and death of Simon Magus.
 Glendenning Cram's novel The Acts of Simon Magus is an imagined autobiography of Simon, from his childhood in Samaria to his final downfall in Rome.
 In his 1991 novel Flicker, Theodore Roszak uses Simon Magus or Simon the Magician, in a fictionalized manner, as being the founder of The Cathars, which later become The Orphans Of The Storm in the book's storyline.
 A reference to Simon Magus appears in the MR James short story 'Lost Hearts'. Mr. Abney's special book notes 'It is recorded of Simon Magus that he was able to fly in the air, to become invisible, or to assume any form he pleased, by the agency of a soul of a boy whom, to use the libellous phrase employed by the author of the Clementine Recognitions, he had murdered'.
 Philemon, a central spirit guide figure within Carl Jung's The Red Book is identified as Simon Magus.
 Simon Magus is the main antagonist in Chris Heimerdinger's The Sacred Quest and The Lost Scrolls, the 5th and 6th Books of the Tennis Shoes Adventure Series
 In God & Golem, Inc., Norbert Wiener summarizes the story of Simon Magus, analogizing the powers and duties of priests to those of modern technologists: "There is a sin, which consists of using the magic of modern automatization to further personal profit or let loose the apocalyptic terrors of nuclear warfare. If this sin is to have a name, let that name be Simony or Sorcery."

Painting and sculpture
The fall of Simon Magus has been a favorite subject of artists.

Video games
 Simon lends his name (but very little else) to Simon the Sorcerer, a well-known fantasy point-and-click adventure game, which has been followed by a whole series.

References

Cultural depictions of New Testament people
Cultural depictions of ancient Israelite and Judean people
Cultural depictions of occultists
Cultural depictions of men
Biblical topics in popular culture
Popular culture